Ann Millier is an American ice dancer.  She competed with her brother Harvey Millier.

Results
(with Millier)

References

 USFSA media guide, 1998/99 edition

American female ice dancers
Living people
Year of birth missing (living people)
21st-century American women